The 1986 Belgian Grand Prix was a Formula One motor race held at the Circuit de Spa-Francorchamps on 25 May 1986. It was the fifth race of the 1986 FIA Formula One World Championship. The race was the 44th Belgian Grand Prix and the 32nd to be held at Spa-Francorchamps.

The race was won by British driver Nigel Mansell, driving a Williams-Honda. It was Mansell's first victory of the season. Brazilian driver Ayrton Senna finished second in a Lotus-Renault, with Sweden's Stefan Johansson third in a Ferrari. Senna's result allowed him to take the lead of the Drivers' Championship from Frenchman Alain Prost, who could only manage sixth in his McLaren-TAG.

Qualifying
Brabham entered only one BT55, the car of Riccardo Patrese. Elio de Angelis had been killed in a testing accident at Circuit Paul Ricard just over a week before the race. Williams-Honda driver Nelson Piquet took pole late in the qualifying session using the team's spare car. Piquet's engine blew up in his race car during qualifying forcing him into the spare. Austrian Gerhard Berger scored his first front row start and the first for the BMW powered Benetton after being fastest in Friday qualifying. His Friday time of 1:54.468 was half a second faster than his Saturday time but still good enough for the front row. World Champion Alain Prost was third in his McLaren-TAG with the Lotus-Renault of Ayrton Senna completing the second row. Nigel Mansell qualified fifth in his Williams-Honda with Teo Fabi completing the top 6 in his Benetton-BMW.

Race
Piquet won the start and led the field into the La Source hairpin but behind him was chaos. Senna had made a good start from the 2nd row and when Berger's car twitched under brakes Senna went to the outside and then turned hard into the right hand corner. In doing so he squeezed out Berger who in turn squeezed out Prost while avoiding Senna. Prost, who had gone inside when the Benetton twitched, hit the inside barrier damaging the nose of his car with the right front wing drooping on the ground. He then drove over Berger's wheel launching the rear of his McLaren into the air. Other drivers were forced to take avoiding action with Berger's teammate Fabi having to stop to avoid hitting his teammates damaged car while Prost's teammate Keke Rosberg had to do a complete 180 degree turn the wrong way to avoid the Benettons. However, the only car that retired from the crash was the Lola-Ford of Patrick Tambay who went inside the stopped Fabi but hit his right rear with his left front wheel and damaged the left front suspension putting him out on the spot. Through it all Senna emerged unscathed in 2nd place followed by Mansell and the two Ferraris of Stefan Johansson and Michele Alboreto.

Both Berger and Prost pitted at the end of lap 1 with Berger in for a long stop for repairs and Prost for a new nose cone,  his rear suspension survived intact despite its unscheduled first corner flight. Mansell disposed of Senna on lap 2, but spun on lap 5, falling back to 4th place. Piquet led until suffering turbo failure on lap 16 leaving Senna in front from Mansell, who shortly overtook Senna during pitstops. Prost emerged last on the road and only a few hundred metres in front of the leading Williams. On his way to being the last car on the lead lap and finishing in sixth place he set a new lap record of 1:59.282 on lap 31.

Nigel Mansell scored his first win of 1986 and the third win of his career. Senna, the cause of the first corner crash finished 20 seconds behind in second with Stefan Johansson finishing third after passing team leader Alboreto only two laps from home. Jacques Laffite finished fifth in his Ligier-Renault with Prost gaining a vital World Championship point for finishing sixth. Swiss driver Marc Surer finished ninth in his Arrows A8 in what would be the last Grand Prix of Surer's career – he would be seriously injured competing in the European Rally Championship a week later. Post race Mansell dedicated his win to his friend and former team mate Elio de Angelis who died just ten days prior to Spa in a testing accident at Paul Ricard.

Classification

Qualifying

Race

Championship standings after the race

Drivers' Championship standings

Constructors' Championship standings

References

Belgian Grand Prix
Belgian Grand Prix
Grand Prix